Marie Charlotte Robertson (born 14 April 1977) is a Swedish actress.  She was born in Sunne, Sweden.

Filmography
 Rederiet (TV, 1998)
 Trettondagsafton (TV, 1999)
 Tre kronor (TV, 1999)
 Ett litet rött paket (TV, 1999)
 Heartbreak Hotel (2006)
 Rallybrudar (2008)
 Playa del Sol (TV, 2009)
 Saltön (TV, 2010)
 Solsidan (TV, 2011)
 Gränsen (2011)
 Hur många lingon finns det i världen? (2011)
Svensson, Svensson (2011)
 Cockpit (2012)
De närmaste (2012)
Real Humans, Äkta människor (TV, 2013) : Bea/Beatrice Novak
Solsidan (TV, 2013)
Beck (TV, 2015) Familjen
Morden i Sandhamn (TV, 2015)
Sommaren med släkten (TV, 2019)
Solsidan (TV, 2019)
Panik i Tomteverkstan (TV, 2019)
Fullt hus (TV, 2020)
Lyckoviken (TV, 2021)

External links
 
www.marierobertson.com 

1977 births
Living people
People from Sunne Municipality
Swedish film actresses
Swedish television actresses
20th-century Swedish actresses
21st-century Swedish actresses